Highway 302 is a highway in the Canadian province of Saskatchewan. It runs from the northern terminal of the Weldon Ferry, which connects to Highway 682 across the South Saskatchewan River, to a dead end near the Nisbet Provincial Forest.

Highway 302 goes eastward from the South Saskatchewan River, passing near the communities of Birson, Fir Ridge, Cecil, and Cudworth Junction. It then enters the city of Prince Albert as 15th Street. Within Prince Albert, Highway 302 connects with Highway 2 and Highway 3. West of Prince Albert, it passes through the Prince Albert Settlement and near the community of Lily Plain before ending.

Highway 302 can be utilized to reach the Lacolle Falls and Saskatchewan River Forks provincial parks area.

History
Saskatchewan Highways and Transportation (SHT), now the Ministry of Highways and Infrastructure undertook a landslide risk management system program to monitor risk sites, applying technological innovations to prevent any further erosion of the riverbank and plan responses to future landslide movement detected by monitors. Highway 302 near Prince Albert along the North Saskatchewan River near the Saskatchewan Penitentiary has experienced retrogressive landslides.

Major intersections
From west to east:

See also
 List of Saskatchewan provincial highways

References

External links
Saskatchewan Highways 

302
Transport in Prince Albert, Saskatchewan